Petros Psychas (born 28 August 1998) is a Cypriot footballer who currently plays as a forward for Olympiakos Nicosia on loan from Apollon Limassol.

Club career
Psychas made his senior debut for Apollon against AC Omonia in May 2016, playing 90 minutes in a 2–1 victory. After a long spell out injured, he returned to the club's under 21 side in April 2017.

Career statistics

Club

Notes

References

External links
 Profile at UEFA

1998 births
Living people
Cypriot footballers
Cyprus youth international footballers
Apollon Limassol FC players
Olympiakos Nicosia players
Cypriot First Division players
Association football forwards